The Ignatian Volunteer Corps (IVC) is an American-Catholic volunteer service which matches volunteers with charities and nonprofits. IVC supports members of its corps through monthly faith sharing meetings, occasional retreats, and opportunities for one on one spiritual reflection in the Ignatian tradition.

History 

IVC was founded in September, 1995 by Jesuit teachers Jim Conroy S.J. and Charlie Costello S.J. with eleven service members in three cities (Philadelphia, Baltimore, Washington D.C.).  Corps members began by serving children and adults in need and reflecting together on their service experiences.  Today, over 600 corps members serve in 25 cities across the country.  The organization relies on a network of Directors and Regional Councils, led by a President/CEO and a national Board of Directors.  The IVC national office is located in Baltimore, Maryland.

In 2002, Jim Conroy stepped down from the Executive director position in order to continue his Jesuit mission of service elsewhere.  He still maintains contact with IVC and serves on the Board of Directors.

On October 29, 2004, Charlie Costello died from ill health.

IVC was founded 1995 by Jim Conroy SJ and Charlie Costello SJ in response to both the growing retired and semi-retired community in the U.S. and the desire of mature adults to express their faith in the light of Vatican II.  From a handful of service members working in Baltimore at its founding, IVC has grown to over 650 service members nationwide. As IVC grew, it adopted a regional chapter model with twenty-three regions reporting to a national headquarters in Baltimore. Regional offices are managed by directors who have the resources, flexibility, and sufficient autonomy to accomplish the local mission of IVC while conforming to the essential norms and values of the IVC. Each office is expected to be economically viable, which is to say, covering all local operating expenses plus sharing in overhead costs related to all IVC regions such as costs related to accounting, payroll, grant writing, and marketing support.

The Program 

Members of IVC's service corps commit to 600 hours a year (roughly two days a week) of skilled service with local charities.  IVC works with partner community organizations addressing myriad social ills and working to create a more just world.  Candidates for service positions are screened and vetted by region directors.  Suitable candidates are then matched with a service placement based on skills, experience, and desire.  IVC service members commit to one year of service with the ability to renew that commitment each year thereafter.  Along with their hours of service with partner agencies, IVC service members attend monthly support meetings and engage on reflection on their service assignment.  IVC service members receive no material compensation for their work, remain in their own homes and continue to be involved in their family, parish and community activities.

Partner agencies apply to IVC to receive a service member.  IVC leverages human capital in the form of lifetimes of personal and professional experience.  Partner agencies gain voluntary part-time nurses, lawyers, counselors, architects, and financial planner through IVC.

IVC's Roots 

IVC accepts and encourages Ignatian volunteers of all Christian faiths. The program itself is rooted in the spirituality of St. Ignatius of Loyola, founder of the Society of Jesus.  While members of the Society of Jesus, or Jesuits, are members of a religious order, IVC is one way among many for lay people to experience Ignatian spirituality. Ignatian spirituality is the practice of taking time to reflect and pray, to imitate Jesus and to discern God’s calling.  IVC borrows much from St. Ignatius of Loyola - his compassion; his commitment to people who are poor, marginalized, and abandoned; his desire to serve and bring about reconciliation in the world through love.  IVC encourages its Volunteers to proceed in such a way of pilgrimage and labor in Christ. 

The concepts of mission and reflection surface frequently in the Spiritual Reflection component of IVC.  To a follower of Ignatian spirituality, service and reflection reinforce each other and seek to unite the volunteer with a very real notion of charity and, therefore, mission to live as “men and women for others”.  Ignatius writes in The Spiritual Exercises, "Consider the address which Christ our Lord makes to all his servants and friends whom He sends on this enterprise, recommending to them to seek to help all, first by attracting them to the highest spiritual poverty, and should it please the Divine Majesty, and should he deign to choose them for it, even to actual poverty."  IVC promotes in mature adults the expression of divine love through service of and in the world.

2007 CARA Study 

In January 2007, IVC turned to the Center for Applied Research in the Apostolate (CARA) at Georgetown University in order to better understand the effect of IVC on its former and current Ignatian Volunteers, spouses and spiritual reflectors.  The resulting national survey of volunteers found that over 93% felt that their service in IVC had helped them feel that they were spending their retirement in a fulfilling way.  91% of volunteers felt that the spiritual reflection component of IVC had somewhat or very much helped them to see God in the people they served.  One volunteer said, “The most satisfying [experience] was the looks on the faces of nearly a dozen cook-trainees when I responded to an inquiry by one of them as to why I did this individual resource for them. I answered: “Because I love you.” The silence was absolute for maybe a minute and then they all stood as one and applauded; at least four of us were crying.”

External links
 Ignatian Volunteer Corps
 Society of Jesus in the U.S.A.
 Catholic Network of Volunteer Services

References 

Non-profit organizations based in the United States
Society of Jesus